Niafunké Cercle  is an administrative subdivision of the Tombouctou Region of Mali. The administrative center (chef-lieu) is  the town of Niafunké. In the 2009 census the cercle had a population of 184,285. The Niger River runs for 100 km through the cercle.

The cercle is subdivided into eight communes:

Banikane Narhawa
Dianké
Fittouga
Koumaïra
Léré
N'Gorkou
Soboundou
Soumpi

References

Cercles of Mali
Tombouctou Region